Wólka Górska  is a village in the administrative district of Gmina Jabłonna, within Legionowo County, Masovian Voivodeship, in east-central Poland.

The village has a population of 75.

References

Villages in Legionowo County